In electronics, a signal trace or circuit trace on a printed circuit board (PCB) or integrated circuit (IC) is the equivalent of a wire for conducting signals. Each trace consists of a flat, narrow part of the copper foil that remains after etching. Signal traces are usually narrower than power or ground traces because the current carrying requirements are usually much less.

See also
Ground plane
Stripline
Microstrip

References 

Electrical connectors
Printed circuit board manufacturing